Eténèsh Wassié (born 1971) is an Ethiopian jazz singer, renowned for her collaborative approach to music and performance.

Biography 
Wassié was born in 1971 in Gondar to an Ethiopian Orthodox family. She began performing in the 1990s in Addis Ababa in azmaribèt - a crossover between cabaret and the Azmari vocal tradition. She is renowned for singing in Amharic and is a leading blues singer in Addis Ababa where she lives.

In 2007 Wassié began a collaboration with Mathieu Sourisseau, which fused together her knowledge of traditional music and his jazz guitar, known as Ethio-jazz. She performed at Seine-Saint Denis Festival in 2018, celebrating twenty years of 'Éthiopiques'''.

 Discography 

 Zeraf! (2007, album with Le Tigre des Plantanes)
 Belo Belo (2010, album with Mathieu Sourisseau)
 Yene Alem (2018, album with Mathieu Sourisseau)
 Hagir Fikir'' (2020, single with Ozferti)

References

External links 
Eténèsh Wassié on Spotify

QWANQWA feat. Etenesh Wassie - Ambassel

1971 births
Ethiopian Orthodox Christians
People from Gondar
Living people
21st-century Ethiopian women singers
Women jazz singers
Amharic-language singers